Route 335 is a collector road in the Canadian province of Nova Scotia.

It is located in Yarmouth County and connects Pubnico at Trunk 3 with Lower West Pubnico.

Communities
Lower West Pubnico
Middle West Pubnico
West Pubnico
Pubnico

History
 
The entirety of Collector Highway 335 was once designated as Trunk Highway 35.

See also
List of Nova Scotia provincial highways

References

Nova Scotia provincial highways
Roads in Yarmouth County